Ansar Maksutovich Ayupov (born 23 March 1972) is a Russian football coach and a former player. He is an assistant coach with FC Ural-2 Yekaterinburg.

Personal life
His son Timur Ayupov is a footballer.

External links
 Player page on the official FC Baltika Kaliningrad website 

1972 births
Footballers from Moscow
Living people
Russian footballers
Association football midfielders
Russia under-21 international footballers
Russian expatriate footballers
Expatriate footballers in the Netherlands
FC Asmaral Moscow players
FC Lokomotiv Moscow players
FC Twente players
FC Dynamo Moscow players
FC Kuban Krasnodar players
FC Chernomorets Novorossiysk players
FC Rubin Kazan players
FC Baltika Kaliningrad players
Russian Premier League players
Russian football managers
FC MVD Rossii Moscow players